Harpalus obliquus is a species of ground beetle in the subfamily Harpalinae. It was described by G.Horn in 1880.

References

obliquus
Beetles described in 1880